"Sparrow in the Treetop" is a popular song written by Bob Merrill. The song was published in 1951.

1951 recordings
Charting versions of the song were made by: 
Guy Mitchell, who recorded the most popular version, reaching number 8 on the Billboard chart.
Bing Crosby and The Andrews Sisters, recorded February 8, 1951,  also reaching number 8 on the Billboard chart. 
Rex Allen, who reached number 28 on the Billboard chart. The Allen version crossed over to Billboard's Most Played Juke Box/Folk chart, peaking at number 10.

References

Songs written by Bob Merrill
1951 songs
Guy Mitchell songs
Rex Allen songs